The 3rd Glover Trophy was a motor race, run to Formula One rules, held on 11 April 1955 at Goodwood Circuit, West Sussex. The race was run over 21 laps, and was won by British driver Roy Salvadori in a Maserati 250F. Salvadori also set fastest lap. Stirling Moss, also in a Maserati 250F, started from pole position.

Results

References 

Glover Trophy
Glover Trophy
Glover Trophy
Glover Trophy